II Field Force, Vietnam was a United States Army Corps-level command during the Vietnam War.

Activated on 15 March 1966, it became the largest corps command in Vietnam and one of the largest in Army history. II Field Force was assigned the lineage of the XXII Corps, a World War II corps in the European Theater of Operations. II Field Force was a component of U.S. Military Assistance Command Vietnam (MACV) and had its headquarters in Long Binh.

Area of responsibility

II Field Force's area of responsibility was III Corps Tactical Zone, later renamed Military Region 3, which comprised eleven provinces surrounding Saigon. This was designed to mimic the ARVN III Corps region. II Field Force controlled units participating in the 1968 Tet Offensive and the 1970 Cambodian Incursion.

Units assigned
At various times during the Vietnam War, II FFV controlled the following units:
1st Infantry Division
9th Infantry Division
25th Infantry Division
101st Airborne Division
1st Cavalry Division (Airmobile)
3rd Brigade 82nd Airborne Division
3rd Brigade, 4th Infantry Division
173rd Airborne Brigade
196th Light Infantry Brigade
199th Light Infantry Brigade
11th Armored Cavalry Regiment
12th Combat Aviation Group
23rd Artillery Group
54th Artillery Group
53rd Signal Battalion
1st Australian Task Force
Royal Thai Army Volunteer Force

II Field Force Vietnam Headquarters Elements:
Company F (Long Range Patrol) 51st Infantry (Airborne)
Company D (Ranger) 151st Infantry (Airborne), Indiana National Guard
Company D (Ranger) 75th Infantry (Airborne)
HHB, II FFV Artillery
303rd ASA Battalion
6th Psychological Operations Battalion
2nd Civil Affairs Company
552 Military Police Company
9th Transportation Company
44th Army Postal Company
29th Chemical Detachment
61st Medical Detachment (MB)
7th Military History Detachment
219th Military Intelligence Detachment
14th Public Information Detachment
16th Public Information Detachment
16th Signal Detachment
265th FA Radar Detachment (AN/TPS-25)

Inactivation
II Field Force was inactivated on 2 May 1971, during the withdrawal of U.S. ground combat forces from Vietnam, with its assets providing the basis for its successor, Third Regional Assistance Command (TRAC).

Commanders
 Lieutenant General Jonathan O. Seaman (March 1966 – March 1967)
 Lieutenant General Bruce Palmer Jr. (March–July 1967)
 Major General Frederick C. Weyand (July 1967 – August 1968)
 Major General Walter T. Kerwin Jr. (August 1968 – April 1969)
 Lieutenant General Julian J. Ewell (April 1969 – April 1970)
 Lieutenant General Michael S. Davison (April 1970 – May 1971)

Lineage and honors

Lineage
Constituted 9 January 1944 in the Army of the United States as Headquarters and Headquarters Company, XXII Corps.
Activated 15 January 1944 at Fort Campbell, Kentucky. 
Inactivated 20 January 1946 in Germany. 
Allotted 12 July 1950 to the Regular Army. 
Redesignated 5 January 1966 as Headquarters and Headquarters Company, II Field Force. 
Activated 10 January 1966 at Fort Hood, Texas. 
Redesignated 15 March 1966 as Headquarters and Headquarters Company, II Field Force Vietnam. 
Inactivated 3 May 1971 at Fort Hood, Texas.
Redesignated 2 September 1982 as Headquarters and Headquarters Company, XXII Corps.

Campaign Participation Credit

World War II
Central Europe
Vietnam
Counteroffensive
Counteroffensive, Phase II
Counteroffensive, Phase III
Tet Counteroffensive
Counteroffensive, Phase IV
Counteroffensive, Phase V
Counteroffensive, Phase VI
Tet 69/Counteroffensive
Summer- Fall 1969
Winter- Spring 1970
Counteroffensive, Phase VII

Honors

Meritorious Unit Commendation (Army), streamer embroidered VIETNAM 1966–1967
Meritorious Unit Commendation (Army), streamer embroidered VIETNAM 1967–1969
Meritorious Unit Commendation (Army), streamer embroidered VIETNAM 1969
Meritorious Unit Commendation (Army), streamer embroidered VIETNAM 1969–1971
Republic of Vietnam Cross of Gallantry with Palm, streamer embroidered VIETNAM 1970
Republic of Vietnam Civil Action Honor Medal, First Class, streamer embroidered VIETNAM 1969-1970

Shoulder Sleeve Insignia

Description
On a shield arched at top 3 3/8 inches (8.57 cm) in height and 2 3/8 inches (6.03 cm) in width overall a crusader's unsheathed sword, point to top and with white blade and yellow hilt, superimposed on a blue stylized arrow throughout, shaft tapered and points and angled tips of arrowhead touching top and sides of shield, the areas on each side of the tapered shaft yellow and the areas on each side of the arrowhead red all within a 1/8 inch (.32 cm) white border.

Symbolism 
The shape of the shield and the unsheathed crusader's sword (the "Sword of Freedom") were suggested by the shoulder sleeve insignia previously authorized for the United States Military Assistance Command, Vietnam, and the United States Army, Vietnam.  The stylized blue arrow and sword are used to represent the purpose and military might of the II Field Force pressing against, sweeping back, and breaking through enemy forces symbolized by the red areas.  The dividing of the red and yellow areas of the shield into two parts allude to the numerical designation of the II Field Force, the colors red and yellow also being those of Vietnam.  The colors red, white and blue are the national colors of the United States and further allude to the three major combat arms:  Infantry, Artillery and Armor.

Background 
The shoulder sleeve insignia was approved on 5 October 1966.   (TIOH Dwg. No. A-1-437)

Distinctive Unit Insignia

Description/Blazon
A gold color metal and enamel insignia 1 1/4 inches (3.18 cm) in height overall consisting of a gold and scarlet device in the shape and background design of the authorized shoulder sleeve insignia of the II Field Force, Vietnam, between two conjoining green fronds of palm all surmounted by a vertical stylized blue arrow with a shallow pointed tapered shaft, the tip of the arrow and the shaft extending beyond the background design and over the palm frond, the side tips of the arrow touching the sides and the two areas above the side tips of scarlet, bearing an unsheathed Crusader sword with point up, the hilt gold and the blade white.

Symbolism 
The operations and numerical designation are indicated by the scarlet and gold (yellow) device in the shape and background design of the authorized shoulder sleeve insignia of the II Field Force, Vietnam, and by the unsheathed Crusader sword which has become associated with Vietnam and the blue stylized arrow both of which were also suggested by the shoulder sleeve insignia and when taken together allude to the numeral II (or Second).  The scarlet and gold (yellow) background and green palm fronds refer to the major combat operational area of the II Field Force which includes the defense of Saigon. The palm fronds are also symbolic of successful achievement.

Background 
The distinctive unit insignia was approved on 27 November 1968.

Combat Service Identification Badge

A gold color metal and enamel device 2 inches (5.08 cm) in height consisting of a design similar to the shoulder sleeve insignia.

Notes

References
 
Stanton, Shelby, Vietnam Order of Battle, 

Military units and formations of the United States Army in the Vietnam War
Corps of the United States Army
Military units and formations established in 1966
Military units and formations disestablished in 1971